Hypsopygia costalis, the gold triangle or clover hay moth, is a species of moth of the family Pyralidae. It was described by Johan Christian Fabricius in 1775 and is found in Europe. The wingspan is 16–23 mm. The adult moths fly from May to July, depending on the location. The supposed species H. aurotaenialis is included here pending further study.

The caterpillars feed on dry vegetable matter. They have been found in haystacks or thatching, as well as in chicken (Gallus) and magpie (Pica) nests. The caterpillar is injurious to clover hay, and to other hay when mixed with clover. Its depredations can be prevented by keeping the hay dry and well ventilated, as the insect preferably breeds in moist or matted material such as is to be found in the lower parts of haystacks, where affected hay becomes filled with webbings of the caterpillars and their excrement, rendering it unfit for feeding. A treatment is to burn the webbed material and to thoroughly clean the affected location.

Synonyms
Junior synonyms of this species are:
 Hypsopygia aurotaenialis (Christoph, 1881) (but see above)
 Hypsopygia rubrocilialis (Staudinger, 1870)
 Phalaena costalis Fabricius, 1775
 Pyralis fimbrialis Denis & Schiffermüller, 1775
 Pyralis hyllalis Walker, 1859
 Tortrix purpurana Thunberg, 1784
 Pyralis costalis
 Hypsopygia syriaca Zerny, 1914
 Pyralis unipunctalis Mathew, 1914
 Pyralis ustocilialis Fuchs, 1903

Footnotes

References

 Grabe, Albert (1942): Eigenartige Geschmacksrichtungen bei Kleinschmetterlingsraupen ["Strange tastes among micromoth caterpillars"]. Zeitschrift des Wiener Entomologen-Vereins 27: 105–109.

External links
 Gold Triangle Hypsopygia costalis at UKMoths

Moths described in 1775
Pyralini
Moths of Europe
Moths of Asia
Taxa named by Johan Christian Fabricius